Six ships of the Royal Navy have been named HMS Swinger:

, a 14-gun (later 12-gun) Conquest-class gun brig launched at Limehouse in 1794 and sold in 1802.
, a 6-gun gunvessel purchased locally in Honduras in 1798, and whose fate in unknown.
, a 12-gun Archer-class gun brig launched at Topsham in 1804 and broken up in June 1812.
, a 12-gun Bold-class gun brig launched at Bridport in 1813, converted to a mooring lighter in 1829 and broken up in 1877.
, a 4-gun  launched at Northfleet in 1855 and broken up in 1864.
, a 4-gun  launched at Pembroke Dockyard in 1872, hulked in 1895 and sold in 1924.

References

Royal Navy ship names